TVNZ 6 was a digital-only, commercial-free television channel operated by Television New Zealand. It launched in September 2007, and was available in 60.3% of New Zealand homes on the Freeview and SKY Television Digital platforms. TVNZ 6 was on air daily from 6am to midnight.

The name TVNZ 6 was chosen because it was numeric, was deemed to allow 'a broader content structure than any descriptive title', and matched the number assigned to it on the Freeview electronic programme guide.

Schedule
TVNZ 6 showed pre-school programmes during the Kidzone block from 6am to 6pm. Until its closure at the end of June 2012, TVNZ 7 also aired Kidzone from 6am to 8am. Kidzone also received a 24-hour channel on Sky TV called Kidzone24. The channel then played family programmes after Kidzone until closedown at midnight.

At launch
At the very start of TVNZ 6's launch, the channel was structured such that its daily schedule had three separate services titled: TVNZ Kidzone (6am to 4pm), TVNZ Family (4pm to 8:30pm), and TVNZ Showcase (8:30pm to midnight).

Closure
TVNZ 6 ceased broadcasting on 28 February 2011 and was replaced on 13 March 2011 by TVNZ U, a "social" channel targeted at 15- to 24-year-olds. Kidzone, Shortland Street: From the Beginning and other TVNZ 6 content moved to sister channels TVNZ 7, TVNZ Heartland and TVNZ Kidzone24. TVNZ U was advertiser-supported and ran from midday to midnight.

References 

Commercial-free television networks
TVNZ
Television stations in New Zealand
Television channels and stations established in 2007
Television channels and stations disestablished in 2011
English-language television stations in New Zealand
2007 establishments in New Zealand
2011 disestablishments in New Zealand
Defunct television channels in New Zealand